The Beiping–Hankou Railway Operation (Mid August – Dec. 1937) was a follow up to the Battle of Beiping–Tianjin of the Japanese army in North China at the beginning of the 2nd Sino-Japanese War, fought simultaneously with Tianjin–Pukou Railway Operation. The Beiping–Hankou Railway Operation was not authorized by the Imperial General Headquarters. The Japanese advanced to the south along the Beiping–Hankou Railway until the Yellow River, capturing Linfen  along the way. After the Imperial General Headquarters wrestled control over troops from local commanders, the majority of participating Japanese units were transferred to participate in the concurrent Battle of Taiyuan. These units were replaced by newly formed 108th and 109th divisions.

Aftermath 
After the stalemate at Yellow River from December 1937 to March 1938, the fighting resumed resulting in Battle of Xuzhou.

See also 
 Order of Battle Peiking – Hankou Railway Operation

References

Conflicts in 1937
1937 in China
1937 in Japan